St. John's Episcopal Church and Cemetery is a historic church located at 718 Jackson Street in Thibodaux, Louisiana.

Erected in 1843, the brick church was a Greek Revival building. Despite some alterations in 1867 or 1868 the building still retains its original architectural style. The bell was presented to the church in 1855, and it's possible that the cupola was not existing before this time. In 1856 the portico was enclosed to create a vestibule. The recessed chancel with domed ceiling was added in c.1867.

The  area, comprising the church and adjacent cemetery, was added to the National Register of Historic Places on September 13, 1977.

See also
 National Register of Historic Places listings in Lafourche Parish, Louisiana

References

Episcopal church buildings in Louisiana
Churches on the National Register of Historic Places in Louisiana
Greek Revival church buildings in Louisiana
Churches completed in 1843
Anglican cemeteries in the United States
Buildings and structures in Thibodaux, Louisiana
Churches in Lafourche Parish, Louisiana
19th-century Episcopal church buildings
1843 establishments in Louisiana
National Register of Historic Places in Lafourche Parish, Louisiana